Moryang station is a railway station of the Donghae Line and Jungang Line in Gyeongju, North Gyeongsang Province, South Korea.

History
25 December 1922: Started operation as Gwangmyeong Station.
1 June 1939: The station name was changed to Moryang Station.
1 July 2001: The station hanja name was changed from Moryang (毛良) to ​​Moryang (牟梁).
18 December 2017: Suspension of passenger handling and downgrading to signal station.
28 December 2021: Donghae Line and Jungang Line was double-tracked and electrified, and moved to new station.

References

External links
Moryang Station

Railway stations in North Gyeongsang Province
Korail stations
Gyeongju
Railway stations opened in 1922